The Creede Formation is a geologic formation in Colorado. It preserves fossils dating back to the Paleogene period, particularly many well-preserved fossil plants from Oligocene strata.

See also

 List of fossiliferous stratigraphic units in Colorado
 Paleontology in Colorado

References

 

Paleogene Colorado